The RV Southern Surveyor was an Australian marine research vessel.  It was owned and managed by the Commonwealth Scientific and Industrial Research Organisation (CSIRO), with its operations funded by the Australian Government to undertake oceanographic, geoscience, ecosystem and fisheries research.  It was built in the UK in 1972 and acquired by CSIRO in 1988.  It was replaced in 2014 by the RV Investigator.

Achievements
The ship has carried out 111 Marine National Facility research voyages in the course of which she has travelled 481,550 km.  Achievements include the discovery of submarine volcanoes between Fiji and Samoa, the compilation of climate records from ancient corals, the production of a carbon chemistry map of the Great Barrier Reef, and the 2006 discovery of a 200 km diameter vortex in the waters above the Perth Canyon off the coast of Rottnest Island, Western Australia.

In 2012 the Southern Surveyor confirmed the 'undiscovery' of Sandy Island.

References

Further reading

External links

 CSIRO Marine National Facility – Southern Surveyor

Research vessels of Australia
1971 ships
CSIRO